Alter Ego was an American melodic rock band from Virginia formed in the 1980s. In 1989, they released their only album, Fear.

Band members
Glen Kuykendall - guitar
Ronni Roth - drums
Chris Fisher - bass
Julie Jewell - vocals

Latter day
Kuykendall currently resides in Nashville, Tennessee, where he plays in a number of different bands, works as a songwriter, session musician, record producer and guitar teacher. He released an album, Can You Hear It Ring?, in 2007. He was featured in the Soundpage of the August 1990 edition of Guitar Player.

As of 2009, Fisher plays in the Washington, D.C. band, Aces & Eights.

Discography

Albums
Fear (1989)

References

External links
Alter Ego at AOR-FM
Chris Fisher's Profile at Aces & Eights Web Page
Glen Kuykendall at MySpace
Aces & Eights web site

Rock music groups from Virginia